This article lists the performances of each of the 27 national teams which have made at least one appearance in the European Men's Handball Championship finals.

Debut of teams
Each successive European Men's Handball Championship has had at least one team appearing for the first time. Teams in parentheses are considered successor teams by IHF.

Participating nations
Legend
 – Champions
 – Runners-up
 – Third place
 – Fourth place
5th – Fifth place
6th – Sixth place
7th – Seventh place
8th – Eighth place
9th – Ninth place
10th – Tenth place
11th – Eleventh place
12th – Twelfth place
MR – Main round
GS – Group stage
Q – Qualified for upcoming tournament
q – may still qualify for upcoming tournament
 – Did not qualify
 – Disqualified
 – Did not enter / Withdrew / Banned
 – Hosts

1 FR Yugoslavia competed as such until 2003 when the FRY was reconstituted as a State Union Serbia and Montenegro. Since the dissolution of the union in 2006, national teams exist for both countries.

Results of host nations

Results of defending champions

References

European Men's Handball Championship